Pedro Ortiz Bernat (born 19 August 2000) is a Spanish footballer who plays as a midfielder for Portuguese club Vizela on loan from Sevilla Atlético.

Club career
Born in Sóller, Mallorca, Balearic Islands, Ortiz was a CD Atlético Baleares youth graduate. He made his senior team debut on 2 September 2018, coming on as a second-half substitute for Kike López in a 1–0 Segunda División B home win against CD Alcoyano.

Ortiz scored his first senior goal on 24 March 2019, netting his team's second in a 2–0 away success over RCD Espanyol B. On 5 July, Sevilla FC reached an agreement in principle with Atlético Baleares for the signing of Ortiz, and he signed a four-year deal three days later, being assigned to the reserves also in the third division.

Ortiz made his first team – and La Liga – debut with the Andalusians on 15 August 2021, replacing Joan Jordán late into a 3–0 home defeat of Rayo Vallecano.

On 17 January 2023, Ortiz joined Vizela in the Portuguese top-tier Primeira Liga on loan until the end of the 2022–23 season.

References

External links

2000 births
People from Sóller
Footballers from Mallorca
Living people
Spanish footballers
Association football midfielders
La Liga players
Primera Federación players
Segunda División B players
CD Atlético Baleares footballers
Sevilla Atlético players
Sevilla FC players
F.C. Vizela players
Spanish expatriate footballers
Expatriate footballers in Portugal
Spanish expatriate sportspeople in Portugal